Dispensa’s Kiddie Kingdom and Castle of Toys was a 5-acre amusement park and toy store located on a 12.5-acre site in Oakbrook Terrace near the Oakbrook Center shopping center, in DuPage County, Illinois. The store was in business from 1967 to 1985. The amusement park operated from 1975 to 1984.

The Castle of Toys store was the largest independent, free-standing toy store in the world. The store received a fair amount of attention due to its unique shape as a turreted castle which featured oversized toy soldiers lining the edifice.

The Kiddie Kingdom amusement park featured over 30 rides, games, and attractions geared for childern age 12 and under. It advertised rides for a quarter per ride or six rides for a dollar.

Rides
Kiddie Kingdom featured 22 rides which included the following:

 Scrambler
 Tilt-A-Whirl
 Sky Fighter
 Mite Mouse
 Antique Autos
 Youngster's Yachts
 C.P. Huntington 1863
 Merry-Go-Round

History
The Dispensa family business began in 1919 when Nicholas "Nick" S. Dispensa, an Italian immigrant to the U.S., purchased a Ferris wheel for $1500.  The business evolved into Dispensa & Sons Complete Carnivals. In 1924, Nick's son John left school at the age of 12 to work with his father on the carnival.  In 1951, Dispensa purchased the original 25-acre site for $1000 per acre.  Half the land was taken by the state to construct the interchange of Illinois Route 83 and Roosevelt Road.

Advertising
Both the store and the park were heavily advertised through television commercials. It was a staple of Chicago television advertising, particularly during the Christmas season.

Its jingle featured a woman singing this song, with a child's voice interposing spoken comments:
Dispensa's Castle of Toys
(It's a castle!)
Dispensa's Castle of Toys
(It's a toy store!)
Dispensa's Castle of Toys
(It's toy-mendous!)
Come to Dispensa's Castle of Toys
Oakbrook Terrace, Illinois

Despite the visual attempt to rhyme, the last line was pronounced the proper way, "Ill-i-noy", rather than the colloquial "Ill-i-noise".

Kiddie Kingdom also had a memorable jingle:

(Kids are King!) At Dispensa's Kiddie Kingdom
(Fun's the thing!) At Dispensa's Kiddie Kingdom
Exciting rides (to make you yell and holler)
Any ride a quarter (six for a dollar; this eventually became "five for a dollar")
Dispensa's Kiddie Kingdom...  Let's Go!!!

Closing
Despite tremendous growth culminating in its most profitable year in 1984, the business closed in 1985 for economic reasons.  Property values had increased in the surrounding area to the point where the underlying land was more valuable than the business itself which prompted the Dispensas to sell the remaining land to a developer. In October 1985, the business was auctioned off by Norton Auctioneers. The site of the toy store and "Kiddie Kingdom" is now occupied by the 31-story Oakbrook Terrace Tower office building.

References

External links

 The official Dispensa's Kiddie Kingdom Website
 TV Commercial featuring the jingle in the article

Retail companies established in 1967
Defunct companies based in Illinois
Toy retailers of the United States
Amusement parks opened in 1975
Defunct amusement parks in the United States
Amusement parks in Illinois
Closed amusement parks
Amusement parks closed in 1984